Albi is a commune in southern France. It is the prefecture of the Tarn department, on the river Tarn, 85 km northeast of Toulouse. Its inhabitants are called Albigensians. It is the seat of the Archbishop of Albi.

The episcopal city, around the Cathedral Sainte-Cécile, was added to the UNESCO list of World Heritage Sites in 2010 for its unique architecture. The site includes the Musée Toulouse-Lautrec, dedicated to the artist who was born in Albi.

Administration
Albi is the seat of four cantons, covering 16 communes, with a total population of 72,416 (2019).

History
The first human settlement in Albi was in the Bronze Age (3000–600 BC). After the Roman conquest of Gaul in 51 BC, the town became Civitas Albigensium, the territory of the Albigeois, Albiga. Archaeological digs have not revealed any traces of Roman buildings, which seems to indicate that Albi was a modest Roman settlement.

In 584, Gregory of Tours reports that the majority of the townsfolk died from plague.

In 1040, Albi expanded and constructed the Pont Vieux (Old Bridge). New quarters were built, indicative of considerable urban growth. The city grew rich at this time, thanks to trade and commercial exchanges, and also to the tolls charged to travelers for using the Pont Vieux.

In 1208, the Pope and the French king joined forces to combat the Cathars, who had developed their own version of ascetic Christian dualism, and so a heresy considered dangerous by the dominant Catholic Church. Repression was severe, and many Cathars were burnt at the stake throughout the region. The area, until then virtually independent, was reduced to such a condition that it was subsequently annexed by the French Crown.

After the upheaval of the Albigensian Crusade against the Cathars, the bishop Bernard de Castanet, in the late 13th century, completed work on the Palais de la Berbie, a Bishops' Palace with the look of a fortress. He ordered the building of the cathedral of Sainte-Cécile starting in 1282. The town enjoyed a period of commercial prosperity largely due to the cultivation of Isatis Tinctoria, commonly known as woad. The fine houses built during the Renaissance bear witness to the vast fortunes amassed by the pastel merchants.

Albi had a small Jewish community during medieval times, until it was annihilated in the 1320s Shepherds' Crusade. Afterwards, Jews were only allowed to transit the town by payment, without living in it. In 1967, approximately 70 Jews lived in Albi, most of them of North-African origin.

Albi has conserved its rich architectural heritage which encapsulates the various brilliant periods of its history. Considerable improvement and restoration work has been done, to embellish the old quarters and to give them a new look, in which brick reigns supreme.

Main sights
Albi was built around the original cathedral and episcopal group of buildings. This historic area covers 63 hectares. Red brick and tiles are the main feature of most of the edifices. Along with Toulouse and Montauban, Albi is one of the main cities built in Languedoc-style red brick.

Among the buildings of the town is the Sainte Cécile cathedral, a masterpiece of the Southern Gothic style, built between the 13th and 15th centuries. It is characterised by a strong contrast between its austere, defensive exterior and its sumptuous interior decoration. Built as a statement of the Christian faith after the upheavals of the Cathar heresy, this gigantic brick structure was embellished over the centuries: the Dominique de Florence Doorway, the 78 m high bell tower, the Baldaquin over the entrance (1515–1540). The rood screen is a filigree work in stone in the Flamboyant Gothic style. It is decorated with a magnificent group of polychrome statuary carved by artists from the Burgundian workshops of Cluny and comprising over 200 statues, which have retained their original colours.

Older than the Palais des Papes in Avignon, the Palais de la Berbie, formerly the Bishops' Palace of Albi, now the Toulouse-Lautrec Museum, is one of the oldest and best-preserved castles in France. This imposing fortress was completed at the end of the 13th century. Its name comes from the Occitan word Bisbia, meaning Bishops' Palace.

The Old Bridge (Pont Vieux) is still in use after almost a millennium. Originally built in stone (in 1035), then clad with brick, it rests on eight arches and is 151 m long. In the 14th century, it was fortified and reinforced with a drawbridge, and houses were built on the piers.

Albi is a city known for its elite Lycée Lapérouse, a high school with 500 students situated inside an old monastery. It has several advanced literature classes. Furthermore, it is one of the few holding a full-scale music section with special high-tech rooms for this section.
The Pacific explorer Jean-François de Galaup, comte de Lapérouse is commemorated in the museum.

Located in an ancient mill (41 rue Porta), the Le LAIT Art Centre is a research laboratory dedicated to contemporary art.

Henri de Toulouse-Lautrec
The Toulouse-Lautrec Museum houses more than 1000 works, including 31 famous posters. This body of work forms the largest public collection in the world devoted to Henri de Toulouse-Lautrec, who was born in Albi in 1864.

World Heritage Site
UNESCO's World Heritage Centre notes the Old Bridge (Pont-Vieux), the Saint-Salvi quarter, the quarter's church, the fortified cathedral (late 13th century) in unique southern French Gothic style from local brick, the bishop's Palais de la Berbie, and residential quarters, which help the Episcopal City of Albi form a "coherent and homogeneous ensemble of monuments and quarters that has remained largely unchanged over the centuries... a complete built ensemble representative of a type of urban development in Europe from the Middle Ages to the present day."

Transport
Albi is served by two railway stations on the line from Toulouse to Rodez:
 Gare d'Albi-Ville
 Gare d'Albi-Madeleine

The A68 motorway connects Albi with Toulouse (and Lyon N 88, future motorway).

Sport
 SC Albi – The city's rugby union team competing in the second-level Rugby Pro D2.
 RC Albi – A rugby league team that compete in the Elite One Championship.
 US Albi – A Union Sports Football Club established in 1912 in Albi playing the Regional 2 Level.
 Albi held Stage 13 of the 2007 Tour de France. The stage was a  individual time trial which started and finished in the city.
 Albi was the finish of Stage 10 of the 2019 Tour de France on Mon 15 July. There was a rest day at Albi on the 16th and Albie was the start of stage 11 to Toulouse On Weds 18 July.  
 Circuit d'Albi, a motor racing circuit used for national racing surrounding Albi's airport.

Education
 École des mines d'Albi-Carmaux
 Jean-François Champollion University Center for Teaching and Research

Climate
Albi experiences a humid subtropical climate (Köppen climate classification Cfa) bordering oceanic climate (Cfb). Like much of southwestern France, the summers tend to be warmer and the winters milder than most areas of similar classification. Substantial summer rainfall prevents its climate from being classified as Mediterranean.

Population

Twin towns – sister cities

Albi is twinned with:
 Girona, Spain
 Palo Alto, United States
 Randwick, Australia

Notable people
Antoinette de Saliès (1639–1730), writer, feminist
Jean-François de Galaup, comte de Lapérouse (1741 – c. 1788), Pacific explorer
Henri de Toulouse-Lautrec (1864–1901), painter, caricaturist, illustrator
Pierre Benoit (1886–1962), novelist, screenwriter

Gallery

See also
Lion and Sun
Tourism in Tarn

References

External links

Official website (in French)
Tourist Office of Albi
Archdiocese of Albi (Albia) – Article from the Catholic Encyclopedia 1908
Albi (in English)
Detailed description of the Madeleine Church of Albi 

 
Communes of Tarn (department)
Prefectures in France
World Heritage Sites in France
Jewish French history
Judaism in France
Languedoc
Cities in Occitania (administrative region)